Anurak Laowong (born 21 January 1982) is a Thai para table tennis player. He won a bronze medal at the 2016 Summer Paralympics.

References 

1982 births
Living people
Table tennis players at the 2016 Summer Paralympics
Medalists at the 2016 Summer Paralympics
Medalists at the 2020 Summer Paralympics
Anurak Laowong
Anurak Laowong
Anurak Laowong
Paralympic medalists in table tennis
Anurak Laowong
Table tennis players at the 2020 Summer Paralympics
Anurak Laowong
Anurak Laowong